The kamancheh (also kamānche or kamāncha) is an Iranian bowed string instrument used in Persian, Azerbaijani, Armenian, Kurdish, Georgian, Turkmen, and Uzbek music with slight variations in the structure of the instrument. The kamancheh is related to the rebab which is the historical ancestor of the kamancheh and the bowed Byzantine lyra. The strings are played with a variable-tension bow.

In 2017, the art of crafting and playing with Kamantcheh/Kamancha was included into the UNESCO Intangible Cultural Heritage Lists of Azerbaijan and Iran.

Name and etymology 
The word "kamancheh" means "little bow" in Persian (kæman, bow, and -cheh, diminutive). The Turkish word kemençe is borrowed from Persian, with the pronunciation adapted to Turkish phonology. It also denotes a bowed string instrument, but the Turkish version differs significantly in structure and sound from the Persian kamancheh. There is also an instrument called kabak kemane literally "pumpkin-shaped bow instrument" used in Turkish music which is only slightly different from the Iranian kamancheh.

Structure 
The kamancheh has a long neck including fingerboard which kamancheh maker shapes it as a truncated inverse cone for easy bow moving in down section, pegbox in both side of which four pegs are placed, and finial Traditionally kamanchehs had three silk strings, but modern instruments have four metal strings. Kamanchehs may have highly ornate inlays and elaborately carved ivory tuning pegs. The body has a long upper neck and a lower bowl-shaped resonating chamber made from a gourd or wood, usually covered with a membrane made from the skin of a lamb, goat or sometimes a fish, on which the bridge is set. From the bottom protrudes a spike to support the kamancheh while it is being played, hence in English, the instrument is sometimes called the spiked fiddle. It is played sitting down held like a cello though it is about the length of a viol. The end-pin can rest on the knee or thigh while the player is seated in a chair.

Kamancheh is usually tuned like an ordinary violin (G, D, A, E).

Notable kamancheh players 

Habil Aliyev
Mehdi Bagheri
Ali-Asghar Bahari
Mark Eliyahu
Kayhan Kalhor
Ardeshir Kamkar
Kourosh Babaei
Sayat-Nova
Yaara Beeri

See also 
List of bowed stringed instruments
Music of Iran
Music of Azerbaijan
Byzantine lira
Haegeum
Rebab
Silk Road Ensemble

References

Further reading

External links 

 Nay-Nava: The Encyclopedia of Persian Music Instruments
 Kamanche, Iran, ca. 1869
 Kamanche, Iran, ca. 1880

Azerbaijani musical instruments
Kurdish musical instruments
Persian musical instruments
Spike lutes
Drumhead lutes
Bowed instruments
String instruments
Iranian inventions